Schwarzl Freizeit Zentrum is an indoor arena in Premstätten, Austria.  It currently holds 5,000 spectators and is hosts indoor sporting events such as tennis and basketball. It hosted the 1994 Davis Cup tennis match between Austria and Germany.

References

External links 

Indoor arenas in Austria
Tennis venues in Austria
Basketball venues in Austria
Buildings and structures in Graz
Sport in Styria
Sports venues in Styria